Enyo gorgon is a moth of the  family Sphingidae.

Distribution 
It is found from Mexico to the northern part of South America.

Description 
The wingspan is 66–72 mm. There are probably two to three generations per year. Adults are on from May to June, August to September and from December to January in Costa Rica. In Bolivia, adults have been recorded from October to November. It has been recorded in August in Mato Grosso in Brazil and in February in Peru.

biology 
The larvae feed on Vitaceae species, including Vitis tiliifolia, as well Tetracera volubilis of the family Dilleniaceae. The pupa is dark and smooth with a long, sharp cremaster.

References

Enyo (moth)
Moths described in 1777
Sphingidae of South America
Moths of South America
Taxa named by Pieter Cramer